This is a list of compositions by composer, orchestrator and conductor Elmer Bernstein.

He composed and arranged scores for over 100 film scores including: Sudden Fear (1952), The Man with the Golden Arm (1955), The Ten Commandments (1956), Sweet Smell of Success (1957), The Magnificent Seven (1960), To Kill a Mockingbird (1962), The Great Escape (1963), Hud (1963), Thoroughly Modern Millie (1967), True Grit (1969), Ghostbusters (1984), The Black Cauldron (1985), The Grifters (1990), Cape Fear (1991) and Far from Heaven (2002).

Filmography 
Source: Turner Classic Movies

1950s

1960s

1970s

1980s

1990s

2000s

Television films and series 
Source: Turner Classic Movies

1950s
 General Electric Theater (1958–59; 8 episodes)
 Johnny Staccato (1959–60; 23 episodes)
 Riverboat (1959–60; 18 episodes)

1960s
 The Beachcomber (1962; 13 episodes)
 The Dick Powell Show (1962; 1 episode)
 The DuPont Show of the Week (1962; 1 episode)
 The Making of the President, 1960 (1963; Television film)
 Hollywood and the Stars (1963–64; 7 episodes)
 National Geographic Specials (1966; 1 episode)
 ABC Stage 67 (1966–67; 2 episodes)
 The Big Valley (1967–68; 24 episodes)
 Julia (1968–70; 60 episodes)

1970s
 Owen Marshall: Counselor at Law (1971–74; 20 episodes)
 Gunsmoke (1972; 1 episode)
 The Rookies (1972–74; 12 episodes)
 Ellery Queen (1975–76; 17 episodes)
 Serpico (1976; Pilot episode)
 Captains and the Kings (1976; Miniseries – 8 episodes)
 Once An Eagle (1976–77; Miniseries – 7 episodes)
 Seventh Avenue (1977; Miniseries – 2 episodes)
 Little Women (1978; Miniseries – 2 episodes)
 The Chisholms (1979; Miniseries – 4 episodes)

1980s
 Guyana Tragedy: The Story of Jim Jones (1980; Television film)
 This Year's Blonde (1980; Television film)
 Ripley's Believe It or Not! (1983; 1 episode)
 Gulag (1985; Television film)

1990s
 The Bogie Man (1992; Television film)
 Fallen Angels (1993–95; 10 episodes)
 Rough Riders (1997; Miniseries – 2 episodes)
 Introducing Dorothy Dandridge (1999; Television film)

2000s
 Cecil B. De Mille – American Epic (2004; Television film)

Theatre
 Peter Pan (1954) – composer of incidental music
 How Now, Dow Jones (1967) – Composer – Tony co-nomination for Best Musical, Tony co-nomination for Best Composer and Lyricist
 Merlin (1982) – composer and incidental-music composer – Tony co-nomination for Best Composer and Lyricist

Source: Playbill

Concert works 
Woodstock Fair (1948)
Pennsylvania Overture (1958)
Concertino for Ondes Martenot (1983)
Songs of Love and Loathing (1990)
Concerto for Guitar and Orchestra (1999)
Fanfare for the Hollywood Bowl (2004)
Source: Elmer Bernstein: Discography

Hit records 
The Man With the Golden Arm soundtrack (1956, no. 2 on Billboard charts)
Walk on the Wild Side soundtrack (1962, no. 33)
Walk on the Wild Side single (1962, Brook Benton, no. 43)
Walk on the Wild Side single (1962, Jimmy Smith, no. 21)
The Great Escape soundtrack (1963, no. 50)
Love With the Proper Stranger single (1964, Jack Jones, no. 63)
Baby, the Rain Must Fall single (1965, Glenn Yarbrough, no. 12)
True Grit single (1969, Glen Campbell, no. 35)
Ghostbusters soundtrack (1984, no. 6)

Source: Elmer Bernstein: Discography

References 

Film and television discographies
Lists of compositions by composer